Aimé Mignot (3 December 1932 – 26 March 2022) was a French footballer who played as a defender for Aix and Lyon. He coached Lyon, Angers, Alès and the France women's national team.

References

1932 births
2022 deaths
Sportspeople from Aix-en-Provence
French footballers
Association football defenders
Ligue 1 players
Pays d'Aix FC players
Olympique Lyonnais players
French football managers
Ligue 1 managers
Ligue 2 managers
Olympique Lyonnais managers
Angers SCO managers
Olympique Alès managers
France women's national football team managers
Footballers from Provence-Alpes-Côte d'Azur